Auburn Battlefield, also known as Coffee Hill Battlefield, is a national historic district and American Civil War battlefield located near Catlett, Fauquier County, Virginia.  It encompasses the areas of the two Auburn battles on October 13 and 14, 1863, and includes 18 contributing buildings, 23 contributing sites, and 8 contributing structures.  The battles are referred to as the First Battle of Auburn and Second Battle of Auburn.

It was listed on the National Register of Historic Places in 2011.

References

Battlefields of the Eastern Theater of the American Civil War
Historic districts on the National Register of Historic Places in Virginia
Buildings and structures in Fauquier County, Virginia
National Register of Historic Places in Fauquier County, Virginia
Conflict sites on the National Register of Historic Places in Virginia
Virginia in the American Civil War